Amurensine is an alkaloid found in Papaver species such as P. alpinum, P. pyrenaicum, P. suaveolens, and P. tatricum and P. nudicaule.

See also
 C19H19NO4

References 

Alkaloids found in Papaveraceae
Benzylisoquinoline alkaloids
Tropane alkaloids
Benzodioxoles